Jaidevi is a small village in Mandi District in Himachal Pradesh.
It is situated 13 km off the National Highway that connects Chandigarh and Manali, NH-21.  It is also en route to Karsog which is a small but important town of Mandi District.

The name of the village derives from the temple of Kamaksha temple. Kamkasha mata is also kul devi of  King Of Suket The ancient temple is highly revered and visited by thousands of devotees.  It is also the family deity of the erstwhile raja (ruler) of Suket state which was merged in the state of Himachal Pradesh in April 1948. The village is situated at an elevation of about 1200m above the sea level and is surrounded by thick pine forest which really makes its ambiences scenic and worth of visiting.  The view of Kamrunag and Shikari mountains is breath taking from here. 
There is a government senior secondary school Jaidevi , Post office, an ayurvedic dispensary Jaidevi and branch of the State Bank of India Jaidevi in the village.

The population of the village (Panchayat) is about 5,000.  The village population is mainly dependent on agriculture and the chief crop of the village is maize.

Villages in Mandi district